The London Transport Museum (often abbreviated as the LTM) is a transport museum based in Covent Garden, London. The museum predominantly hosts exhibits relating to the heritage of London's transport, as well as  conserving and explaining the history of it. The majority of the museum's exhibits originated in the collections of London Transport, but, since the creation of Transport for London (TfL) in 2000, the remit of the museum has expanded to cover all aspects of transportation in the city and in some instances beyond.

The museum operates from two sites within London. The main site in Covent Garden uses the name of its parent institution, and is open to the public every day excluding over Christmas, having reopened in 2007 after a two-year refurbishment. The other site, located in Acton, is known as the London Transport Museum Depot and is principally a storage site of historic artefacts that is open to the public on scheduled visitor days throughout the year.

The museum was briefly renamed London's Transport Museum to reflect its coverage of topics beyond London Transport, but it reverted to its previous name in 2007 to coincide with the reopening of the Covent Garden site.

Museum (Covent Garden)

The museum's main facility is located in a Victorian iron and glass building that had formed part of the Covent Garden vegetable, fruit and flower market. It was designed as a dedicated flower market by William Rogers in 1871 and is located between Russell Street, Tavistock Street, Wellington Street and the east side of the former market square. The market moved out in 1971, and the building was reopened as the London Transport Museum on 28 March 1980.  The collection had been located at Syon Park since 1973 and before that had formed part of the British Transport Museum at Clapham.

On 4 September 2005 the museum closed for a major £22 million refurbishment designed by Bryan Avery of Avery Associates Architects to enable the expansion of the display collection to encompass the larger remit of TfL which administers all forms of public transport. Enhanced educational facilities were also required. The museum reopened on 22 November 2007.

The entrance to the museum is from the Covent Garden Piazza, amongst the Piazza's many tourist attractions. The museum is within walking distance from both Covent Garden Underground station and Charing Cross railway station.

Collection

The first parts of the collection were brought together at the beginning of the 20th century by the London General Omnibus Company (LGOC) when it began to preserve buses being retired from service. After the LGOC was taken over by the London Electric Railway (LER), the collection was expanded to include rail vehicles. It continued to expand after the LER became part of the London Passenger Transport Board in the 1930s and as the organisation passed through various successor bodies up to TfL, London's current transport authority.

The collection has had a number of homes. It was housed as part of the Museum of British Transport at a disused tram depot in Clapham High Street (now a supermarket) from 1963 to 1972, and then at Syon Park in Brentford from 1973 to 1977, before being moved to Covent Garden in 1980. Most of the other exhibits moved to York on formation of the National Railway Museum in 1975.

The Covent Garden building has on display many examples of buses, trams, trolleybuses and rail vehicles from 19th and 20th centuries as well as artefacts and exhibits related to the operation and marketing of passenger services and the impact that the developing transport network has had on the city and its population.  The first underground electric train, from 1890, can be seen here.

Larger exhibits held at Acton depot include a complete 1938 stock tube train as well as early locomotives from the first sub-surface and first deep-level lines.

Other Attractions 
As of 2022, the museum offers three simulator experiences: One Elizabeth Line simulator featuring a cab, a stand-up smaller version of the later, and a 1938 stock simulator complete with deadman's handle.

In addition there is the Hidden London exhibition which has been extended until July 2023, featuring a sized-down, walkthrough replica of the Aldwych Ticket Hall and Down Street Blitz Shelter which Winston Churchill used during World War II. The exhibition tells the story of some of London's abandoned stations and hidden transport infrastructure of which the museum offers some tours of.

There is the Children's interactive area complete with Optare bus and the All Aboard play-zone for 0-7 year olds.

Museum Shop
The museum shop sells a wide range of books, reproduction posters, models, gifts and souvenirs, both at Covent Garden and online. Profits from sales support the museum's activities.

Museum Depot (Acton)

The Museum Depot is located in Acton, west London, and was opened in October 1999. The depot holds the majority of the museum's collections which are not on display in the main museum in Covent Garden. It is the base for the museum's curators and conservators, and is used for the display of items too large to be accommodated in the main facility.

The depot provides 6,000 square metres of storage space in secure, environmentally controlled conditions and houses over 370,000 items of all types, including many original works of art used for the museum's collections of posters, signs, models, photographs, engineering drawings and uniforms. The building has both road access and a rail connection to the London Underground network, which allows the storage and display of significant numbers of buses, trams, trolleybuses, rail rolling stock and other vehicles.

The depot is not regularly open to the public, but is fully equipped to receive visitors, with ticket office, shop, a miniature railway, and other visitor facilities. It opens to the public for pre-booked guided tours on several dates each month, and also for special events, including themed open weekends – usually three times per year. It is within easy walking distance of Acton Town Underground station.

Transport links

See also 
List of British heritage and private railways
List of transport museums (worldwide)
Island Line (Isle of Wight) – operates former London Underground trains in regular public service

Other transport museums with items from London Transport:
London Bus Museum, Weybridge
Alderney Railway – on the Island of Alderney
East Anglia Transport Museum – near Lowestoft
National Railway Museum – York
National Tramway Museum – Crich
The Trolleybus Museum at Sandtoft – in North Lincolnshire
Other transport and industrial museums in London:
Brunel Museum
Kew Bridge Steam Museum
London Canal Museum
London Motorcycle Museum
Science Museum (London)
Walthamstow Pump House Museum
Other major transport museums in the UK:
Black Country Living Museum
Riverside Museum, Glasgow
Museum of Transport in Manchester
Ulster Folk and Transport Museum
Coventry Transport Museum
Past transport museums in the UK:

 North Woolwich Old Station Museum

References

External links

Resource showing the entire collections on display at the Covent Garden site
Explore over 5,000 posters and 700 original poster artworks from the Museums collections
Explore the online photographic collection of over 16,000 photographs

Transport museums in London
City museums in the United Kingdom
History museums in London
Railway museums in England
Bus museums in England
Museums in the City of Westminster
History of transport in London
Museums established in 1980
1980 establishments in England
Covent Garden
Charities based in London
Transport for London